Ilyinsky (masculine), Ilyinskaya (feminine), or Ilyinskoye (neuter) may refer to:

Ilyinsky (surname) (Ilyinskaya)

Places
Ilyinsky District, several districts in Russia
Ilyinsky Urban Settlement, a municipal formation which the Work Settlement of Ilyinsky in Ramensky District of Moscow Oblast is incorporated as
Ilyinskoye Urban Settlement, a municipal formation which the settlement of Ilyinskoye-Khovanskoye and nineteen rural localities in Ilyinsky District of Ivanovo Oblast are incorporated as
Ilyinsky (inhabited locality) (Ilyinskaya, Ilyinskoye), several inhabited localities in Russia
Ilyinsky (volcano), a volcano on the Kamchatka Peninsula

See also
Ilya (disambiguation)
Ilyin
Ilyino
Ilyinka